József Becsei (10 October 1950 – 24 November 2013) was a Hungarian footballer who primarily played as a forward.

József Becsei died on 24 November 2013, aged 63, in Budapest, Hungary.

References

1950 births
2013 deaths
Footballers from Budapest
Hungarian footballers
Association football forwards
Hungary international footballers